Ernest Joseph "Dutch" Harrison (March 29, 1910 – June 19, 1982) was an American professional golfer whose career spanned over four decades—one of the longest in the history of the PGA Tour.

Born in Conway, Arkansas and nicknamed "The Arkansas Traveler", Harrison turned pro in 1930 at the start of the Great Depression. Although he played in what tournaments existed in those days, the mainstay of his income was the many exhibitions and private "money" matches in which he, as well as many of his fellow professionals, played.

Harrison had a total of 18 career victories spanning from the 1939 Bing Crosby Pro-Am to the 1958 Tijuana Open Invitational. However, as late as 1969, Harrison had a top-25 finish in the Canadian Open at the age of 59. He played on three Ryder Cup teams: 1947, 1949, and 1951.

Harrison finished nine times in the top-10 at major championships, including third place finishes at the PGA Championship in 1939 and the U.S. Open in 1960. He won the Vardon Trophy for lowest scoring average in 1954, and ranks fifth on the list of players with the most PGA Tour victories without a major championship on his resume.

In 1954 Harrison became the Old Warson Country Club's first golf professional. He died of heart failure at age 72 in 1982 in St. Louis, Missouri.

Professional wins (26)

PGA Tour wins (18)
1939 (2) Bing Crosby Pro-Am, Texas Open
1944 (2) Charlotte Open, Miami Open
1945 (1) St. Paul Open
1947 (3) Reno Open, Reading Open, Hawaiian Open
1948 (1) Richmond Open
1949 (1) Canadian Open
1950 (1) Wilmington Open
1951 (1) Texas Open
1953 (3) St. Petersburg Open, Western Open, Columbia Open
1954 (1) Bing Crosby Pro-Am Invitational
1956 (1) All American Open
1958 (1) Tijuana Open Invitational

Other wins (8)
1940 Illinois PGA Championship
1942 Illinois PGA Championship
1950 California State Open
1952 Northern California Open, Ampol Tournament (Oct), Havana Invitational
1955 White Sulphur Springs Open
1957 Greenbrier Invitational

Results in major championships

Note: Harrison never played in The Open Championship.

NT = no tournament
WD = withdrew
DQ = disqualified
CUT = missed the half-way cut
R64, R32, R16, QF, SF = Round in which player lost in PGA Championship match play
"T" indicates a tie for a place

Summary

Most consecutive cuts made – 10 (1940 PGA – 1949 Masters)
Longest streak of top-10s – 2 (twice)

U.S. national team appearances
Ryder Cup: 1947 (winners), 1949 (winners), 1951 (winners)
Lakes International Cup: 1954 (winners)

See also
List of golfers with most PGA Tour wins

References

External links
St. Louis Golf History – Dutch Harrison

American male golfers
PGA Tour golfers
Ryder Cup competitors for the United States
Golfers from Arkansas
People from Conway, Arkansas
1910 births
1982 deaths